Gąsior or Gonsior is a Polish-language surname, meaning "gander". Pronounced identically, Gąsior is the standard spelling in Poland while Gonsior appears at a lower frequency. Alternative forms include Gęsior and Gensior, which are likewise pronounced identically (both ).

People
 Dariusz Gęsior (born 1969), Polish footballer
 Bohdan Gonsior (born 1937), Polish fencer
 Franciszek Gąsior (born 1947), Polish handball player
 Łukasz Gąsior (born 1986), Polish swimmer
 Włodzimierz Gąsior (born 1948), Polish football manager

See also
 

Polish-language surnames